RKWard is a transparent front-end to the R programming language, a scripting-language with a strong focus on statistics functions. RKWard tries to combine the power of the R language with the ease of use of commercial statistical packages.

RKWard is written in C++ and although it can run in numerous environments, it was designed for and integrates the KDE desktop environment with the Qt (software) libraries.

Features 

RKWard's features include
Spreadsheet-like data editor
Syntax highlighting, code folding and code completion
Data import (e.g. SPSS, Stata and CSV)
Plot preview and browsable history
R package management
Workspace browser
GUI dialogs for all kinds of statistics and plots

Interface 
RKWard aims to be easy to use, both for people with deep knowledge of R, and for users who, although they have experience in statistics, are not familiar with the language. The application design offers the possibility of using the graphic tools as well as ignoring many of them and using the program as integrated development environment.

It includes a workspace viewer, which gives access to packages, functions and variables loaded by R or imported from other sources. It also has a file viewer, and data set editing windows, display of the contents of the variables, help, command log and HTML output.

It also offers components that help in code editing and direct order execution, such as the script window and the R console, where you can enter complete commands or programs as you would in the original R text interface. It provides additional help such as syntax coloring documentation of functions while writing, and includes the feature of capturing graphs or emerging dialogs produced by offering additional options for handling, saving and exporting them.

Package Management 
The R package management is carried out through a configuration dialog that allows one to, either automatically (because a plug-in requires it) or manually, install new packages from the repository's official project, update existing ones, delete them or upload / download them from the workspace.

Add-ons system 
Thanks to its add-ons system RKWard constantly expands the number of functions that can be accessed without writing the code directly. These components allow, from a graphical user interface, instructions to be generated in R for the most common or complex statistical operations. In this way, even without having deep knowledge about the language it is possible to perform advanced data analysis or elaborated graphs. The results of the computations are formatted and presented as HTML, making it possible, with a single click and drag, to export tables and graphs to, for example, office suites.

rk.Teaching 

RKTeaching (stylized as rk.Teaching) is a package specially designed for use in teaching and learning statistics, integrating modern packages (such as R2HTML, plyr and ggplot2 among others) as RKWard native outputs. As of 2020, RKTeaching is in version 1.3.0.

See also 
 Comparison of statistical packages
 R interfaces

References

External links 
RKWard homepage
'RKWard: A Comprehensive Graphical User Interface and Integrated Development Environment for Statistical Analysis with R', Stefan Rödiger, Thomas Friedrichsmeier, Prasenjit Kapat, Meik Michalke, Journal of Statistical Software

Free R (programming language) software
Free software programmed in C++
Free statistical software
KDE Applications
PHP software